Tony D. James FRSC (born 7 October 1964) is a chemist who is currently Professor of Chemistry at the University of Bath and recipient of the Royal Society Wolfson Research Merit Award.

He was educated at the University of East Anglia (BSc, 1986) and the University of Victoria (PhD, 1991). He was made a Fellow of the Royal Society of Chemistry in 2012 and received the Daiwa Adrian Prize in 2013.

References

1964 births
Living people
Alumni of the University of East Anglia
University of Victoria alumni
Academics of the University of Bath
Fellows of the Royal Society of Chemistry